The 67th Pennsylvania House of Representatives District is located in northern Pennsylvania and has been represented by Martin Causer since 2003.

District profile
The 67th District includes all of Potter County, Cameron County and McKean County.

Representatives

References

Government of Cameron County, Pennsylvania
Government of McKean County, Pennsylvania
Government of Potter County, Pennsylvania
67